USS Beukelsdijk (ID-3135) was a transport ship of the United States Navy during World War I, serving from 1918 to 1919.

Ship history

Military service
The ship was built as the "turret" type steamship Grängesberg by William Doxford & Sons at Sunderland, England, for Wm. H. Müller & Company of Rotterdam and sold to the Holland America Line in 1916 and renamed Beukelsdijk.

The ship was taken over by the United States under the right of angary on 20 March 1918 at San Juan, Puerto Rico. She was commissioned on 21 March 1918.

Assigned to the Naval Overseas Transportation Service (NOTS), Beukelsdijk carried coal to South America; her ports of call included Bahia, Santos, and Rio de Janeiro. Sailing from Rio on 4 June 1918, the freighter reached New York on 6 July, unloaded her cargo of coffee and underwent repairs. She then picked up 818 tons of general cargo, 1,680 tons of bulk oil, and aeroplane parts and proceeded to Hampton Roads to join a France-bound convoy. Although engine problems compelled her to stop four times en route, Beukelsdijk limped into Brest on 26 July and, after undergoing repairs to boilers and engines, proceeded thence to Saint-Nazaire where she unloaded her cargo and took on ballast for the return voyage. The outbreak of Spanish influenza, however, compelled her to remain until 13 October.

Then, upon shifting to Quiberon Bay, Beukelsdijk disembarked her sick sailors to the Naval Hospital there, but suffered further misfortune when a fire broke out in her coal bunkers. The blaze was discovered on 16 October and the crew had to unload a considerable quantity of her fuel in order to extinguish it, a task not completed until the 18th. Sailing for home a week later, Beukelsdijk paused at the Azores from 2 to 9 November and then continued on to New York, where she arrived on 23 November.

Following a lengthy period of repairs, Beukelsdijk sailed from New York on 5 January 1919 for the Gulf of Mexico. Arriving at Galveston, Texas, on the 13th, she sailed for France with a cargo of cotton and oil. She reached Le Havre on the 28th only to encounter further misfortune during the cargo-unloading process when a boiler explosion killed two sailors. Although originally slated to proceed to Plymouth, England, to bunker for the return trip, Beukelsdijk was re-routed to the Netherlands to be returned to her owners. Clearing Le Havre on 24 April, Beukelsdijk was decommissioned and handed back to the Holland America Line at Rotterdam on 19 May 1919. Her name was struck from the Navy List simultaneously.

Civilian service
The ship was sailing from Rotterdam to Narvik when she was wrecked near Bodø, Norway, on 29 January 1923.

References

Notes

Bibliography
 

1903 ships
Ships built on the River Wear
Ships of the Holland America Line
Auxiliary ships of the United States Navy
Shipwrecks of Norway
Maritime incidents in January 1923